Antiope may refer to:

Mythology
 Antiope (Greek myth), several figures in Greek mythology including:
 Antiope (Amazon), daughter of Ares
 Antiope (mother of Amphion), mother of Amphion by Zeus, associated with the mythology of Thebes, Greece
 Antiope (daughter of Pylon), also called Antioche, a daughter of Pylon and wife of Eurytus

Other uses
Antiope, a fragmentary play by Euripides
Antiope, a painting by Titian
 Antiope (character), from the fictional DC Comics universe
 Antiope Reef, a coral reef northeast of Niue
 90 Antiope, a double asteroid
 Antiope (teletext), a now-abandoned teletext system
 , a Panamanian cargo ship in service 1948-64